The Levavasseur project was an early project for a tank designed in 1903 by the French Captain Léon René Levavasseur (1860-1942) of the 6th Artillery Battalion, described as a "self propelled cannon project" (French: Projet de canon autopropulseur). It is considered as the first description, made by a soldier, of what would come to be known as the tank. Levavasseur was a graduate of Ecole Polytechnique, of the promotion of 1881. According to Armoured Fighting Vehicles of the World:

Submission
The project was submitted to the French Technical Artillery Committee (Comité Général d'Artillerie), and after two years of study was presented to the Army Minister by the General President of the Committee. The general described the project in letter No.135, dated 1 February 1905:

Design
The locomotive mechanism is then described as a type of continuous track, supporting an armoured box with a weapon:

Reception
The Artillery Technical Committee raised three major objections:
All-terrain machines had not to that day given satisfaction.
Hard objects could enter the mechanism and damage it.
Direction could not be properly controlled.

Overall, it was not felt that there was a demand for such a machine, and horsedrawn artillery was considered adequate.

Aftermath

Levavasseur reworked his mechanism, improved its resistance to hard objects, and brought forward a new improved project in 1908. He estimated an outlay of 14,000 francs for the construction of a mock-up.

Eventually, the project was completely rejected. A letter dated 13 August 1908 explained that a tractor on continuous tracks was now available from a British company, Richard Hornsby & Sons.

It is unclear whether General Estienne, the French "Father of the tank" ever knew about this project. However, Commandant Léonce Ferrus, who wrote the rejection report, participated in the Schneider tank experiments on 10 September 1915, and in 1916 became involved with the development of the Saint-Chamond tank, which bore what Gougaud describes as "disturbing similarities" to the Levavasseur project, such as layout, armament (Canon de 75), power plant (80 hp engine) and general silhouette.

Levavasseur became a lieutenant colonel of artillery, and retired simply expressing his regret that his views had not been taken into consideration earlier, before the advent of World War I.

See also
 History of the tank

Notes

References
 Alain Gougaud L'Aube de la Gloire, Les Autos-Mitrailleuses et les Chars Français pendant la Grande Guerre, 1987, Musée des Blindés, 
 Armoured Fighting Vehicles of the World Volume I, Cannon Books, 1998, 

Tanks of France
History of the tank